Aruna Chaudhary  is an Indian politician and a member of Indian National Congress. Aruna Chaudhary is a senior leader of Punjab Congress. She is member of 15th Punjab Legislative Assembly (MLA) and represents Dina Nagar constituency.

Political career
Chaudhary was elected to the Punjab Legislative Assembly in 2002 from Dina Nagar. In 2012, she was re-elected from Dina Nagar. She was one of the 42 INC MLAs who submitted their resignation in protest of a decision of the Supreme Court of India ruling Punjab's termination of the Sutlej-Yamuna Link (SYL) water canal unconstitutional.

In addition to this, she is General Secretary, Punjab Pradesh Congress Committee and Member, AICC. Aruna has contested 4 elections in a row on the INC ticket and won 3 of these elections in 2002, 2012, and 2017. In the last elections held in 2017, she secured more than 72000 votes and won with a margin of 31917 votes (highest amongst women and 6th highest in-state) by defeating B.D. Dhupal of BJP. She is most senior amongst only 3 women legislators of the ruling Congress party and is inducted in the council of ministers as a Minister of State. She is now in charge of the Revenue and disaster management departments of Punjab. She was Chairperson of Punjab Civil Supplies department from 2004 to 2007.

Development projects
Aruna has been actively participating in development in and around the constituency and instrumental in construction of 85 km new link roads and repair of all existing roads while serving the tenure as MLA from the constituency that is situated on Indo-Pak international Border. Spearheaded the approvals and getting construction completed for five road culverts and two pontoon bridges, providing piped potable water supply to almost all the villages, construction of Dharamshalas, construction of internal streets, drains in villages and community centre etc.

Social involvement
Got the cases of pension and other admissible benefits to eligible senior citizens, widows and orphans sanctioned from Social Security/Welfare departments. Continuously working for the welfare of society especially youth, women, downtrodden weaker and under privileged sections of the society.

Electoral performance

References

Living people
Indian National Congress politicians from Punjab, India
Punjab, India MLAs 2002–2007
Punjab, India MLAs 2012–2017
21st-century Indian women politicians
21st-century Indian politicians
People from Gurdaspur district
1957 births
Punjab, India MLAs 2017–2022
Women members of the Punjab Legislative Assembly